Mint condition is an expression used to denote the quality of a pre-owned good as displaying virtually no imperfections and being in pristine condition relative to its original production state. Originally, the phrase related to the way collectors described the condition of coins. As the name given to a coin factory is a "mint", then mint condition is the condition a coin is in when it leaves the mint.

Variations 
The term mint condition may be used to describe a variety of collectible items, including action figures, dolls, toys, stamps, records, comic books, video games and similar items. The term may have a slightly different meaning in each case. For instance, when describing trading cards, "perfect" condition is used to describe the condition as it is when pulled from a pack, while "mint" would be new but opened. Similar gradations of mint condition exist for other collectibles based on their specific characteristics. For example, a postage stamp may be mint or mint never hinged.

Abbreviations include:

MIB: Mint In Box
MIP: Mint In Package
MISB: Mint In Sealed Box 
MOC: Mint On Card (for accessories sold attached to a card)
NRFB: Never Removed From Box

See also 

Mint (facility), an industrial facility which manufactures coins
Mint (disambiguation)
Mint stamp
New old stock
Sheldon coin grading scale, including "Mint State"

References

Collecting